Koichi "Nishi" Nishimura (born 30 June 1973 in Kyoto, Japan) is a beach volleyball player from Japan. Nishimura began his career as an indoor volleyball player and played Libero for the Japanese National Team. In 2002 Nishimura switched to beach volleyball. He currently plays in "Winds" beach volleyball team. In 2009, Nishimura founded the environmental non-profit-organisation "Save the Beach".

They were the fourth ranked team at the 2006 Asian Games but were eliminated in the fourth round.

He married volleyball player Kaoru Sugayama in 2011.

Career and awards

1998 – World Championships- Awarded "Best Digger"
1999 Asian Championships – 4th place	
Asian Championships – 4th place- Awarded "Best Digger"
1999 – World Cup
2000 Olympics (Sydney), Asian Preliminary Round - 2nd place

Japan All Stars Awards'

1999 All Star – Fan voting – 1st place
2000 All Star – Fan voting – 2nd place
2001 All Star – Fan voting – 2nd place
 
In 2002 he switched from indoor volleyball to beach volleyball.

2003 Beach Volleyball Japan - Runner-up
2004 JBV Tour, Tokyo - Champion
2005 Beach Volleyball Japan - Champion

At the 2006 Swatch FIVB World Tour, France, he won the 7th place and accomplished the unprecedented feat of becoming the first Japanese man to reach 7th place in a beach volleyball world tour tournament. The Japanese team was awarded "Most Improved Team" title.

2008 JVB Tour, Tokyo - Champion

References

External links
Winds Team profile

1973 births
Japanese beach volleyball players
Japanese men's volleyball players
Living people
Sportspeople from Kyoto
Beach volleyball players at the 2006 Asian Games
Asian Games competitors for Japan